Sprocker may refer to:

 Sprocker spaniel, a cross between a springer spaniel and a cocker spaniel
 Sprocker a minor character in Masters of the Universe